Grabovica is a village in the municipality of Tomislavgrad in Canton 10, the Federation of Bosnia and Herzegovina, Bosnia and Herzegovina. According to the 2013 census, there were 543 inhabitants.

Ivan Ivančić, a Croatian and Yugoslav shot putter was born in Grabovica.

Demographics 

According to the 2013 census, its population was 543.

Footnotes

Bibliography 

 

Populated places in Tomislavgrad